SuperValu is a name used by grocery chains in multiple countries:
 SuperValu (Canada)
 SuperValu (Ireland) (also operating in Spain)
 SuperValu (United States)

See also 
 SuperValue, a New Zealand supermarket chain